The Worst Woman in London is an 1899 English melodrama play about a manipulative woman. It was highly popular particularly in the early years of the 20th century.

It was performed on Broadway in 1903, with Nora Dunblane in the title role, and adapted for TV in 1965.

References

External links
 

1899 plays
Melodramas
English plays